The  is a weekday limited express train service for commuters on the Tōkaidō Main Line operated by East Japan Railway Company (JR East).

Service pattern  
The trains connect the Shōnan region of Kanagawa Prefecture with central Tokyo.

Shōnan Limited Express
There are ten inbound (morning) and eleven outbound (evening) Shōnan services each weekday, taking 69 to 86 minutes between Tokyo/Shinjuku and Odawara.

Route 
The Shōnan operates between Tokyo or Shinjuku and Odawara, mainly on the Tōkaidō Line. Some trains run also on the Tōkaidō Freight Line and the Yokosuka Line, including Shōnan No. 1 (outbound) and Shōnan No. 6, 8, 10 (inbound), and among them, Shōnan No.6 terminates at Shinagawa, and Shōnan No. 8, 10 terminate at the Sōbu Line underground platforms at Tokyo. Shōnan No. 22, 24, 26 terminate at Shinjuku, while Shōnan No. 21, 13 begin at Shinjuku.

Stations served 
Legends:

 △ = Stops, boarding only 
 ▽ = Stops, alighting only
 ● = Stops, boarding and alighting 
 ↑ / ↓ = Passage
 | = Doesn't operate in this section
  = via Tōkaidō Main Line
  = via Tōkaidō Freight Line
  = via Yokosuka Line 
  = via Shōnan-Shinjuku Line (Yamanote Freight Line)

Previous service patterns

Shōnan Liner
There were seven inbound (morning) and nine outbound (evening) Shōnan Liner services each weekday, taking 71 to 91 minutes between Tokyo and Odawara.

Route 
The Shōnan Liner operated between Tokyo and Odawara, mainly on the Tōkaidō Line. Some trains ran also on the Tōkaidō Freight Line and the Yokosuka Line, including Shōnan Liner No. 1 (outbound) and Shōnan Liner No. 4, 6, 8, 10, 12 (inbound), and among them, Shōnan Liner No. 4, 10 terminated at Shinagawa, and Shōnan Liner No. 6, 8 terminated at the Sōbu Line underground platforms at Tokyo.

Stations served 
Legends:

 △ = Stops, boarding only 
 ▽ = Stops, alighting only
 ● = Stops, boarding and alighting 
 ↑ / ↓ = Passage
  = via Tōkaidō Main Line
  = via Tōkaidō Freight Line
  = via Yokosuka Line 

Generally, the stations served for different services all follow the same rules:

 They all stop at Tokyo, Shinagawa, Fujisawa, Chigasaki and Odawara.
 Only inbound services via the Yokosuka Line stop at Shimbashi.
 Only services running solely on the Tōkaidō Main Line stop at Ōfuna and Tsujidō.
 Only services running on the Tōkaidō Main Line (not Freight Line) west of Chigasaki stop at Hiratsuka, Ninomiya and Kōzu.

Ohayō Liner Shinjuku and Home Liner Odawara
The Ohayō Liner Shinjuku operated from Odawara Station to Shinjuku Station in the morning, and the Home Liner Odawara operated in the opposite direction in the evening. There were three inbound and two outbound services each weekday, taking 80 to 88 minutes between Shinjuku and Odawara. The Shinjuku-Odawara service competes with the Romancecar limited express services on the Odakyū Odawara Line, which take a similar amount of travel time. These services were once referred to collectively as the Shōnan-Shinjuku Liner, until late 2002.

Route 
The Ohayō Liner Shinjuku and Home Liner Odawara operated between Shinjuku and Odawara, on the Shōnan–Shinjuku Line, the Tōkaidō Freight Line and the Tōkaidō Main Line.

Stations served 
Legends:

 △ = Stops, boarding only 
 ▽ = Stops, alighting only
 ● = Stops, boarding and alighting 
 ↑ / ↓ = Passage
  = via Tōkaidō Main Line
  = via Tōkaidō Freight Line
  = via Shōnan-Shinjuku Line

Generally, the stations served for different services all follow the same rules:

 They all stop at Shinjuku, Shibuya, Fujisawa, Chigasaki and Odawara.
 Only services running on the Tōkaidō Main Line (not Freight Line) west of Chigasaki stop at Hiratsuka, Ninomiya and Kōzu.

Ticketing 
Liner Tickets can be bought at ticket machines in stations or on platforms, by using cash or IC Cards such as Suica.

Rolling stock

Current
E257-2000/2500 series 5-, 9-, or 14-car EMUs (since 15 March 2021)

Past
183 series 9-car EMUs (until June 2002)
185 series 7-, 10-, 12-, or 15-car EMUs (until 12 March 2021)
189 series 9-car EMUs (until June 2002)
E351 series 12-car EMUs (from March 18, 1996 until March 14, 2008)
E257 series 11-car EMUs (from July 1, 2002 until March 14, 2008)
215 series 10-car EMUs (until 12 March 2021)
251 series 10-car EMUs (Shinjuku services only, until March 2020)

See also
 List of named passenger trains of Japan

References 

East Japan Railway Company
Named passenger trains of Japan
Railway services introduced in 1992
1992 establishments in Japan